Sinéad Ní Uallacháin is an Irish journalist, actress, artist, podcaster, continuity announcer and radio presenter.

Early life
Ní Uallacháin was born in Ballineanig, County Kerry. She went on to study art and architecture in the Dublin Institute of Technology in Bolton Street.

Career
Ní Uallacháin became a radio producer and a broadcaster with RTÉ Raidió na Gaeltachta, presenting the weekday show Sinéad ar Maidin until May 2019, and contributing to Cormac ag a Cúig. She did not give up her art however and has illustrated a children's book by Mícheál Ó hUanacháin amongst other works. Ní Uallacháin has been a judge on TG4's series Réalta agus Gaolta. Ní Uallacháin also acts in theater and has performed in a number of stage shows. In theater she mainly works with Aisteoirí Bulfin. She is on the board of directors for Comharchumann Raidió Átha Cliath Teoranta (C.R.Á.C.T.).

Beo ar Éigean

Ní Uallacháin presents a podcast and radio series Beo ar Éigean ("almost live") with fellow Irish speakers Áine Ní Bhreisleáin and Siún Ní Dhuinn. The three discuss issues from their daily lives.

Works

Illustrated books
 An Tíogar agus a Mhadra, 2014
 Fighting Words, 2014
 Sin Scéal Eile: Gearrscéalta Nuascríofa, 2010
 NÓS
 The Children of the Finca Florencia

Plays
 An Campa
 Biffo Béar
 Gur Eile
 Le Luí na Gealaí
 Domhnall Mac Síthigh
 Na Leabhra

External links 
 
 A question of taste - Sinéad Ní Uallacháin Irish Examiner article

References and sources

21st-century Irish journalists
Living people
Alumni of Dublin Institute of Technology
People from the Dingle Peninsula
RTÉ Raidió na Gaeltachta presenters
21st-century Irish actresses
21st-century Irish women writers
Actors from County Kerry
Irish children's book illustrators
Irish women illustrators
Irish women journalists
Irish women radio presenters
Year of birth missing (living people)